Crocidosema lantana, the lantana flower-cluster moth or lantana tortricid moth, is a moth of the family Tortricidae. It was first described by August Busck in 1910. It is native to Mexico and the southern United States, but was introduced to Hawaii in 1902, Australia in 1914 and the Caroline Islands in 1948 and 1949 to aid in the control of Lantana weeds. It has also been recorded from Yunnan, China and in Sri Lanka.

The larvae feed in pods of Bignonia chrysantha and in flower heads, on berries and also bore in tender twigs of Lantana species. It also feeds in the stem of litchi and in the terminal twigs of Tecoma stans. Full-grown larvae are about 6 mm long and fuscous colored with a slight reddish tinge.

The pupa is brown and about 5 mm long.

References

External links

Moths described in 1910
Eucosmini
Lepidoptera used as pest control agents